Günter Harder (born 14 March 1938 in Ratzeburg) is a German mathematician, specializing in arithmetic geometry and number theory.

Education and career
Harder studied mathematics and physics in Hamburg und Göttingen. Simultaneously with the Staatsexamen in 1964 in Hamburg, he received his doctoral degree (Dr. rer. nat.) under Ernst Witt with a thesis Über die Galoiskohomologie der Tori. Two years later he completed his habilitation. After a one-year postdoc position at Princeton University and a position as an assistant professor at the University of Heidelberg, he became a professor ordinarius at the University of Bonn. With the exception of a six-year stay at the former Universität-Gesamthochschule Wuppertal, Harder remained at the University of Bonn until his retirement in 2003. From 1995 to 2006 he was one of the directors of the Max-Planck-Institut für Mathematik in Bonn.

His research deals with arithmetic geometry, automorphic forms, Shimura varieties, motives, and algebraic number theory. He made foundational contributions to the Waldspurger formula.

He was a visiting professor at Harvard University, Yale University, at Princeton's Institute for Advanced Study (IAS) (for the academic years 1966–1967, 1972–1973, 1986–1987, autumn of 1983, autumn of 2006), at the Institut des Hautes Études Scientifiques (I.H.É.S.) in Paris, at the Tata Institute of Fundamental Research in Mumbai, and at the Mathematical Sciences Research Institute (MSRI) at the University of California, Berkeley. He was an Invited Speaker at the ICM in 1970 in Nice with talk Semisimple group schemes over curves and automorphic functions and in 1990 in Kyōto with talk Eisenstein cohomology of arithmetic groups and its applications to number theory. In 1988 he was awarded the Leibniz Prize by the Deutsche Forschungsgemeinschaft. In 2004 Harder received, with Friedhelm Waldhausen, the von Staudt Prize.

For decades, Harder was known to German mathematicians as the Spiritus Rector for  a mathematical workshop held for one week in spring and one week in autumn; the workshop, sponsored by the Mathematical Research Institute of Oberwolfach, introduced young mathematicians and scientists to important new developments in pure mathematics and mathematical sciences.

With Ina Kersten, he is a co-editor of the collected works of Ernst Witt.

Harder's doctoral students include Kai Behrend, Maria Heep-Altiner and Jörg Bewersdorff.

Selected publications
  (online).
 
  (online)
  (online).
 
 
 
 
 
 

References

External links
 Homepage of Günter Harder at the Hausdorff Center of the University of Bonn
 Homepage of Günter Harder at the University of Bonn

1938 births
Living people
20th-century German mathematicians
21st-century German mathematicians
Algebraists
Number theory
University of Hamburg alumni
Academic staff of the University of Bonn
Academic staff of the University of Wuppertal
Institute for Advanced Study visiting scholars
People from Ratzeburg